Arkane Mohamed (born 11 October 1993) is a Comorian international footballer who plays for French club Beauvais Oise, as a midfielder.

Career
Born in Marseille, Mohamed has played for Sochaux B, Dijon B, Tarbes Pyrénées, Belfort and Beauvais Oise.

He made his international debut for Comoros in 2015.

References

1993 births
Living people
Comorian footballers
Comoros international footballers
French footballers
French sportspeople of Comorian descent
FC Sochaux-Montbéliard players
Dijon FCO players
Tarbes Pyrénées Football players
ASM Belfort players
AS Beauvais Oise players
Association football midfielders